Kabanov is a surname. Notable people with the surname include:

Aleksandr Kabanov (water polo) (born 1948), Russian water polo player and head coach of Russian water polo team
Andrey Kabanov (born 1971), Russian sprint canoeist
Andrey Kabanov (bandy player) (born 1979), Belarusian bandy player
Artyom Kabanov (born 1984), Russian professional footballer
Dmitri Aleksandrovich Kabanov (born 1985), Russian professional football player
Dmitri Kabanov (judoka) (born 1980), Russian judoka
Kirill Kabanov (born 1992), Russian junior ice hockey forward
Konstantin Kabanov (1922–1979), Soviet Air Force officer and Hero of the Soviet Union
Maksim Kabanov (born 1982), Russian footballer
Mikhail Kabanov (1919–1943), Hero of the Soviet Union
Pavel Kabanov (1920–1985), Hero of the Soviet Union
Sergei Kabanov (born 1986), Russian footballer
Taras Kabanov (born 1981), Ukrainian forward
Vasily Kabanov (1908–1945), Red Army Major and Hero of the Soviet Union
Vladimir Kabanov (1918–1977), Soviet Air Force Captain and Hero of the Soviet Union
Yevgeny Kabanov (1918–1989), Soviet Naval Aviation Major general
Yuriy Kabanov, Soviet sprint canoeist who competed in the mid to late 1960s

See also
Cabano
Kaban (disambiguation)
Kabani (disambiguation)
Kabanos
Shabanov

Russian-language surnames